Streptomyces griseorubens is a bacterium species from the genus of Streptomyces which has been isolated from soil. Streptomyces griseorubens produces althiomycin. Streptomyces griseorubens produces matamycin and althiomycin.

Further reading

See also 
 List of Streptomyces species

References

External links
Type strain of Streptomyces griseorubens at BacDive -  the Bacterial Diversity Metadatabase

griseorubens
Bacteria described in 1958